The 2021 World Archery Youth Championships was the 16th edition of World Youth Archery Championships. The event was held in Wrocław, Poland 10-15 August 2021, and was organised by World Archery. Junior events were held for those under 20, and Cadet for those under 18. The best performing nation was India.

Medal summary

Junior

Recurve

Compound

Cadet

Recurve

Compound

Medal table

References

External links
 
Complete Book
2021
International sports competitions hosted by Poland
Sport in Wrocław
World Youth Championship
World Archery
World Archery Youth Championships